Richard David Arthur Burge (born 5 April 1958) is the chief executive of the London Chamber of Commerce. Previously he has had a career in the not-for-profit industry and government sectors, having held chief executive roles in various organizations since 1995. He has also intermittently had portfolio careers and run his own companies.

Early life and education
Burge was born in Hong Kong. His father Arthur Vincent Burge was a serving officer with the Royal Engineers, and his mother was Elsie (Rae) Burge (nee Kimberley).

After primary school in Cardiff and north London (where his father was posted), he went in 1969 to Haberdashers' Adams Grammar School in Newport Shropshire. Burge went to Hatfield College, Durham University from 1977-80, the first member of his family to go to university.

Career
Burge taught biology at King Edward’s School Witley (1980-83) and then went to Sri Lanka as a Commonwealth Scholar until 1986.

Burge joined the British Council in June 1986 where he served in the Overseas Career Service for ten years.  He was Assistant Representative in Lagos Nigeria until March 1990, then had a series of posts in the UK ending up as Head of Africa and Middle East Operations for three years until September 1995.

Senior appointments
Burge was the first Director General of the Zoological Society of London from 1995 to 1999. He was noted by journalists and the government of London as being responsible for saving the London Zoo from bankruptcy during his time as Director General. He then was given the position of Chief executive of the Countryside Alliance under the chairmanship of John Jackson until 2003. He then spent some time in private business working until being appointed as Chief Executive of Wilton Park (an FCO executive agency) from 2009 to 2017. He was then chief executive of the Commonwealth Enterprise and Investment Council until 2019.  In February 2020, he became chief executive of the London Chamber of Commerce and Industry.

Private sector
From 2003-09, Burge had a portfolio of part-time paid appointments.  He was Strategy Director for the African Parks Foundation and a Commissioner for Rural Communities. He is the founding partner of ESG Validation.

Non-profit and charity work
Burge has served a trustee and Board member of a number of charities and not-for-profit organizations including  the Iwokrama Rainforest Research Centre, the Association of Chief Executives in the Voluntary Sector (ACEVO), The Association of Chief Executives (of government executive agencies), the European Zoo Association, the Council of Durham University (including chair of the University Ethics Committee,  Vice Chair of Bridewell Royal Hospital (King Edward’s School Witley), a Commissioner for Commonwealth Scholarships, trustee of the Television Trust for the Environment, and chair of the Global Health Assurance Partnership (based in Geneva), and Treasurer of St John-at-Hackney in London.

He is currently a Trustee of VERTIC, a Court Assistant of the Worshipful Company of World Traders, and has been chair of Council at Hatfield College Durham University for 10 years.

Personal life
He has been married to Karen Jayne Burge (nee Bush) since 1980, having met when they were at school. They live in West Sussex and have two children, Frances and Edward.

References

Further reading
 

1958 births
Living people
Hong Kong people
Alumni of Hatfield College, Durham
People of the British Council
Zoological Society of London